Sportyvna hazeta was Ukraine’s influential sports newspaper and official sports newspaper of the Soviet Government of Ukraine published several (3) days per week in Kyiv in 1934–1992. Following dissolution of the Soviet Union, the newspaper lost its government support and slowly phased out.

It appeared in 1931 in Kharkiv as a Russian language newspaper Gotov k trudu i oboronye, yet its official date of establishment is considered as 1 June 1934 soon after capital of Ukraine was moved to Kyiv from Kharkiv. Since the relocation the newspaper changed to Ukrainian language and changed to Hotovyi do pratsi ta(i) oborony. In 1938 it switched its name again to Radyanskyi sport.

During the World War II in 1940–1949 it was not published.

In October 1949 it was revived as Radyanskyi sport. In April 1965, the newspaper changed its name again to Sportyvna hazeta. At the time of dissolution of the Soviet Union it had some 600,000 subscribers. After 1992 Sportyvna hazeta lost its government support and had difficulties with financing which led to its partial closure starting in late 1999.

In mid 2000s the newspaper was taken under aegis of the National Olympic Committee of Ukraine, but soon was discontinued completely.

References

External links

Ukrainian-language newspapers
Sports newspapers
Mass media in Kyiv
Sports mass media in Ukraine
Publications established in 1934
Publications disestablished in 2008
1934 establishments in Ukraine
2008 disestablishments in Ukraine
Defunct newspapers published in Ukraine
Newspapers published in the Soviet Union
Eastern Bloc mass media
Daily newspapers published in Ukraine